The Bill Hunter Memorial Trophy is awarded annually to the defenceman of the year in the Western Hockey League (WHL). It is named after one of the league's founders, Bill Hunter, who was the driving force behind the creation of the WHL.  Hunter served as the owner, general manager and head coach of the Edmonton Oil Kings, and was the first Chairman of the Board of the new league.

List of winners

See also
CHL Defenceman of the Year – First awarded in 1987–88
Max Kaminsky Trophy – Ontario Hockey League Defenceman of the Year
Emile Bouchard Trophy – Quebec Major Junior Hockey League Defenceman of the Year

Notes

References

Western Hockey League trophies and awards